The Chinese People's Political Consultative Conference (CPPCC), also known as the People's PCC or simply the PCC, is a political advisory body in the People's Republic of China and a central part of the Chinese Communist Party (CCP)'s united front system. Its members advise and put proposals for political and social issues to government bodies. However, the CPPCC is a body without real legislative power. While consultation does take place, it is supervised and directed by the CCP.

The body traditionally consists of delegates from the CCP and its front organizations, eight legally-permitted political parties subservient to the CCP, as well as nominally independent members. The CPPCC is chaired by a member of the Politburo Standing Committee of the Chinese Communist Party. In keeping with the united front strategy, prominent non-CCP members have been included among the Vice Chairs, examples being Chen Shutong, Li Jishen and Soong Ching-ling.

The organizational hierarchy of the CPPCC consists of a National Committee and regional committees. Regional committees extend to the provincial, prefecture, and county level. According to the constitution of the CPPCC, the relationship between the National Committee and the regional committees is one of guidance and not direct leadership. However, an indirect leadership exists via the United Front Work Department at each level. The National Committee of the Chinese People's Political Consultative Conference (shortened ) typically holds a yearly meeting at the same time as plenary sessions of the National People's Congress (NPC). The CPPCC National Committee and NPC plenary sessions are collectively called the Quanguo Lianghui ("National Two Sessions").

The CPPCC is intended to be more representative of a broader range of people than is typical of government office in the People's Republic of China. According to Sinologist Peter Mattis, the CPPCC is "the one place where all the relevant actors inside and outside the party come together: party elders, intelligence officers, diplomats, propagandists, soldiers and political commissars, united front workers, academics, and businesspeople." In practice, the CPPCC serves as "the place where messages are developed and distributed among party members and the non-party faithful who shape perceptions of the CCP and China." The composition of the members of the CPPCC changes over time according to national strategic priorities. Previously dominated by senior figures in real-estate, state-owned enterprises, and "princelings", the CPPCC in 2018 was primarily composed of individuals from China's technology sector.

History 

The Conference dated prior to the existence of the People's Republic of China. During negotiations between the Chinese Communist Party and the Kuomintang in 1945, the two parties agreed to open multiparty talks on post-World War II political reforms via a Political Consultative Conference. This was included in the Double Tenth Agreement. This agreement was implemented by the National Government of the Republic of China, who organized the first Political Consultative Assembly from January 10–31, 1946. Representatives of the Kuomintang, CCP, Chinese Youth Party, and China Democratic League, as well as independent delegates, attended the conference in Chongqing.

In 1949, with the Communist Party having gained control of most of mainland China, they organized a "new" Political Consultative Conference in September, inviting delegates from various friendly parties to attend and discuss the establishment of a new state. This conference was then renamed the People's Political Consultative Conference. The first conference approved the Common Program, which served as the de facto constitution for the next five years. The conference approved the new national anthem, flag, capital city, and state name, and elected the first government of the People's Republic of China. In effect, the first People's Political Consultative Conference served as a constitutional convention.

From 1949 to 1954, the conference became the de facto legislature of the PRC. In 1954, the Constitution transferred this function to the National People's Congress.

Present role 
The CPPCC is the "peak united front forum, bringing together CCP officials and Chinese elites." The CPPCC includes the CCP, eight small legally-permitted parties, and independent nonparty "friends." It provides a "seat" for the non-communist parties and so-called "patriotic democrats." The conception of the non-communist parties as part of a coalition rather than an opposition is expressed in the PRC's constitutional principle of "political consultation and multiparty cooperation." This constitutional principle obliges the CCP to consult the others on all major policy issues. Particularly since the 2000s, CPPCC members frequently petition the Central Committee of the Chinese Communist Party regarding socioeconomic, health, and environmental issues.

According to state media Xinhua News Agency, it is neither a body of state power nor a policymaking organ, but a platform for participating in state affairs.

National Committee 

The National Committee CPPCC is the national level organization that represents the CPPCC nationally and is made up of deputies coming from various sectors of society. Deputies of the NC-CPPCC are elected for 5 year terms.

The chairman of the NC-CPPCC, currently Wang Huning, is a high-ranking office in the country, with the holder generally being a member of the Politburo Standing Committee of the Chinese Communist Party, the country's top decision-making body. The chairman is assisted by several vice chairpersons and a secretary-general.

The CCP and the aligned "democratic parties" participate in the  NC-CPPCC. Besides political parties, NC-CPPCC has also delegates from various sectors of society in its ranks. The parties and groups with delegates to the NC-CPPCC are as follows:

Standing Committee 
In between plenary sessions of the National Committee the duties of the CPPCC are performed by the Standing Committee of the NC-CPPCC. It is responsible for all actions taken by the whole of the National Committee of the Conference or by individual deputies of it. Faction leaders of the National Committee lead the sectoral or party delegations in the Standing Committee that are assigned seats.

Special Committees 
The CPPCC National Committee has 10 Special Committees:
 Handling Proposals Committee
 Economic Affairs Committee
 Agriculture and Rural Affairs Committee
 Population, Resources and Environment Committee
 Education, Science, Health and Sports Committee
 Social and Legal Affairs Committee
 Ethnic and Religious Affairs Committee
 Culture, History and Study Committee
 Liaison with Hong Kong, Macao, Taiwan and Overseas Chinese Committee
 Foreign Affairs Committee

Composition of members 
2158 members in the 13th National Committee of CPPCC:

 Seats for Political Parties (536 in all)
  Chinese Communist Party (97)
  Revolutionary Committee of the Kuomintang (65) 
  China Democratic League (65) 
  China National Democratic Construction Association (64) 
  China Association for Promoting Democracy (45) 
  Chinese Peasants' and Workers' Democratic Party (45) 
  China Zhi Gong Party (29)
  Jiusan Society (44)
  Taiwan Democratic Self-Government League (20) 
  Independents (62)

 Seats for People's organizations (307 in all)
 Communist Youth League of China (9)
 All-China Federation of Trade Unions (60)
 All-China Women's Federation (64)
 All-China Youth Federation (28)
 All-China Federation of Industry and Commerce (61)
 China Association for Science and Technology (43)
 All-China Federation of Taiwan Compatriots (15)
 All-China Federation of Returned Overseas (27)

 Seats for Sectoral representatives (1357 in all)
 Sector of Literature and Arts (142)
 Sector of Science and Technology (110)
 Sector of Social Science (71)
 Sector of Economics (149)
 Sector of Agriculture (67)
 Sector of Education (113)
 Sector of Sports (21)
 Sector of Press and Publication (44)
 Sector of Medicine and Health (88)
 Sector of International Friendship Activists (42)
 Sector of Social Welfare and Social Security (37)
 Sector of the Ethnic Minorities (101)
 Sector of Religions (65)
 Specially Invited Hong Kong Representatives (124)
  Democratic Alliance for the Betterment and Progress of Hong Kong (25)
  Business and Professionals Alliance for Hong Kong (4)
  Hong Kong Federation of Trade Unions (2)
  Liberal Party (Hong Kong) (4)
  New Century Forum (1)
  New Territories Association of Societies (2)
 Specially Invited Macao Representatives (29)
  Macau United Citizens Association (1)
  Macau Business Interest Union (1)
  Macau Union of Professional Interests (2)
  Progress Promotion Union/General Union of the Macao Residents' Associations (1)
  Union for Development/The Women's General Association of Macau (1)
 Other Specially Invited Dignitaries to the Conference (including service personnel of the People's Liberation Army and the People's Armed Police) (154)

The People’s Political Consultative Daily 
The  is the press window of information on direct policies and viewpoints of the CPPCC. Like most of the Chinese political organs, the newspaper serves as the mouthpiece for the conference.

Regional committees 

The following regional committees are modelled after the National Committee with identical composition of deputies elected to them and are each supervised by regional level Standing Committees:

 CPPCC province-level committees
 including regional committees of the autonomous regions and city committees of directly controlled municipal governments (Beijing, Tianjin, Chongqing and Shanghai)
 CPPCC prefecture-level committees
 including autonomous prefectural committees and city committees of sub-provincial and prefectural cities
 CPPCC county-level committees
 including committees of autonomous counties and country-level cities

See also 

 Chinese Literature and History Press, the CPPCC's publishing house
 List of current members of CPPCC by sector

References

External links 

 
 Official news website 
 Official newspaper website

 
1949 establishments in China
China